Santa Fosca may refer to:

 Fusca of Ravenna (died c. 250), a child saint of the Roman Catholic Church
 Santa Fosca, Venice, a church named after and dedicated to Fusca of Ravenna
 Church of Santa Fosca, a different church in Venice that is part of the Torcello Cathedral, also dedicated to Fusca of Ravenna